Oliver P. Morton House is a historic home located at Centerville, Wayne County, Indiana. It was built in 1848, and is a two-story, three bay, brick detached row house with Greek Revival style design influences.  It has a rear service wing with an attached smokehouse.  It was the home of Indiana Governor and U.S. Senator Oliver P. Morton (1823–1877).

It was added to the National Register of Historic Places in 1975. It is located in the Centerville Historic District.

References

Houses on the National Register of Historic Places in Indiana
Greek Revival houses in Indiana
Houses completed in 1848
Buildings and structures in Wayne County, Indiana
National Register of Historic Places in Wayne County, Indiana
Historic district contributing properties in Indiana